In architecture and building engineering, a floor plan is a technical drawing to scale, showing a view from above, of the relationships between rooms,  spaces, traffic patterns, and other physical features at one level of a structure.

Dimensions are usually drawn between the walls to specify room sizes and wall lengths. Floor plans may also include details of fixtures like sinks, water heaters, furnaces, etc. Floor plans may include notes for construction to specify finishes, construction methods, or symbols for electrical items.

Overview
Similar to a map, the orientation of the view is downward from above, but unlike a conventional map, a plan is drawn at a particular vertical position (commonly at about four feet above the floor). Objects below this level are seen, objects at this level are shown 'cut' in plan-section, and objects above this vertical position within the structure are omitted or shown dashed. Plan view or planform is defined as a vertical orthographic projection of an object on a horizontal plane, like a map.

The term may be used in general to describe any drawing showing the physical layout of objects. For example, it may denote the arrangement of the displayed objects at an exhibition, or the arrangement of exhibitor booths at a convention. Drawings are now reproduced using plotters and large format xerographic copiers.

A reflected ceiling plan (RCP) shows a view of the room as if looking from above, through the ceiling, at a mirror installed one foot below the ceiling level, which shows the reflected image of the ceiling above. This convention maintains the same orientation of the floor and ceilings plans – looking down from above. RCPs are used by designers and architects to demonstrate lighting, visible mechanical features, and ceiling forms as part of the documents provided for construction.

The art of constructing ground plans (ichnography; Gr. τὸ ἴχνος, íchnos, "track, trace" and γράφειν, gráphein, "to write"; pronounced ik-nog-rəfi) was first described by Vitruvius (i.2) and included the geometrical projection or horizontal section representing the plan of any building, taken at such a level as to show the outer walls, with the doorways, windows, fireplaces, etc., and the correct thickness of the walls; the position of piers, columns or pilasters, courtyards and other features which constitute the design, as to scale.

Floor plan topics

Building blocks

A floor plan is not a top view or birds eye view.  It is a measured drawing to scale of the layout of a floor in a building.  A top view or bird's eye view does not show an orthogonally projected plane cut at the typical four foot height above the floor level.  A floor plan could show:
 interior walls and hallways
 restroom
 windows and doors
 appliances such as stoves, refrigerators, water heater etc.
 interior features such as fireplaces, saunas and whirlpools
 the use of all rooms

Plan view
A plan view is an orthographic projection of a three-dimensional object from the position of a horizontal plane through the object. In other words, a plan is a section viewed from the top. In such views, the portion of the object above the plane (section) is omitted to reveal what lies beyond. In the case of a floor plan, the roof and upper portion of the walls may typically be omitted. Whenever an interior design project is being approached, a floor plan is the typical starting point for any further design considerations and decisions.

Roof plans are orthographic projections, but they are not sections as their viewing plane is outside of the object.

A plan is a common method of depicting the internal arrangement of a three-dimensional object in two dimensions. It is often used in technical drawing and is traditionally crosshatched. The style of crosshatching indicates the type of material the section passes through.

3D floor plans
A 3D floor plan can be defined as a virtual model of a building floor plan. It is often used to better convey architectural plans to individuals not familiar with floor plans. Despite the purpose of floor plans originally being to depict 3D layouts in a 2D manner, technological expansion has made rendering 3D models much more cost effective. 3D plans show a better depth of image and are often complemented by 3D furniture in the room. This allows a greater appreciation of scale than with traditional 2D floor plans.

See also
 3D printing
 3D scanner
 Architect's scale
 Architectural drawing
 List of floor plan software
 House
 House plan
 Indoor positioning system (IPS)
 Room number

References

External links

 Renaissance Visual Thinking: Architectural Representation as Medium to Contemplate ‘True Form’, Federica Goffi-Hamilton 

Technical drawing
Architectural terminology